Brand of the Outlaws is a 1936 American Western film directed by Robert N. Bradbury for A. W. Hackel's Supreme Pictures.

Plot
A Sheriff and his posse split up to pursue a group of rustlers. Seeing the sheriff alone, the gang shoots him, leaving him for dead. He's found by drifter Gary Grey who treats his wound and takes him to medical attention in town. With his business done Gray leaves and sees the rustler's placing their brand on their stolen cattle. Believing them to be ranch hands, Gary asks them for a job, that their leader Rufe Matlock obliges. When the posse catches up with them, they escape leaving Gray. Deputy Ben Holt decides to handcuff, then brand Gray.

The Sheriff fires Holt for his cruelty, but Holt is actually a member of the gang of rustlers.

Cast 
Bob Steele as Gary Gray
Margaret Marquis as Verna Matlock
Jack Rockwell as Deputy Ben Holt
Charles King as Rufe Matlock
Virginia True Boardman as Mrs. Matlock, Verna's Mother
Ed Cassidy as The Sheriff
Frank Ball as The Doctor

References

External links 

1936 films
1936 Western (genre) films
American black-and-white films
American Western (genre) films
1930s English-language films
Films directed by Robert N. Bradbury
1930s American films